Henry Stone is an American politician serving as a member of the Iowa House of Representatives from the 9th district. Elected in November 2020, he assumed office on January 11, 2021.

Early life and education 
Stone was raised in a military family and lived throughout the country as a child. After graduating from high school, he joined the United States Air Force. He served in the Air Force for 22 years and retired as a master sergeant. He earned a Bachelor of Business Administration from the University of Phoenix and a Master of Education from Trident University International.

Career 
Since retiring from the military, Stone has worked as a college football coach.  He was an assistant coach at Waldorf University where he coached wide receivers and quarterbacks.  He was elected to the Iowa House of Representatives in November 2020 and assumed office on January 11, 2021. He also serves as vice chair of the House Economic Growth Committee. Stone is a member of the Iowa Law Enforcement Academy Council.

References 

Living people
University of Phoenix alumni
Republican Party members of the Iowa House of Representatives
People from Forest City, Iowa
Year of birth missing (living people)